A paperback (softcover, softback) book is one with a thick paper or paperboard cover, and often held together with glue rather than stitches or staples. In contrast, hardcover (hardback) books are bound with cardboard covered with cloth, leather, paper, or plastic.

Inexpensive books bound in paper have existed since at least the 19th century in such forms as pamphlets, yellowbacks, dime novels, and airport novels. Modern paperbacks can be differentiated from one another by size. In the United States, there are "mass-market paperbacks" and larger, more durable "trade paperbacks". In the United Kingdom, there are A-format, B-format, and the largest C-format sizes.

Paperback editions of books are issued when a publisher decides to release a book in a low-cost format. Lower-quality paper, glued (rather than stapled or sewn) bindings, and the lack of a hard cover may contribute to the lower cost of paperbacks. In the early days of modern paperbacks, the 1930s and '40s, they were sold as a cheaper, less permanent, and more convenient alternative to traditional hardcover books, as the name of the first American paperback publisher, Pocket Books, indicates. In addition, the Pocket Books edition of Wuthering Heights, one of the first ten books it published in 1939, emphasized the impermanence of paperbacks by telling readers if you "enjoyed it so much you may wish to own it in a more permanent edition", they could return the 25 cent book to Pocket Books with an additional 70 cents and it would send them a copy of the 95 cent Modern Library edition "substantially bound in durable cloth."

Since the mid 20th Century, paperbacks can also be the preferred medium when a book is not expected to be a major seller and the publisher wishes to release a book without a large investment. Examples include many novels and newer editions or reprintings of older books.

Because paperbacks tend to have smaller profit margins, many publishers try to balance the profit to be made by selling fewer hardcovers against the potential profit to be made by selling more paperbacks with a smaller profit per unit. First editions of many modern books, especially genre fiction, are issued in paperback. Best-selling books, on the other hand, may maintain sales in hardcover for an extended period to reap the greater profits that the hardcovers provide.

History

The early 19th century saw numerous improvements in the printing, publishing and book-distribution processes, with the introduction of steam-powered printing presses, pulp mills, automatic type setting, and a network of railways. These innovations enabled the likes of Simms and McIntyre of Belfast, Routledge & Sons (founded in 1836) and Ward & Lock (founded in 1854) to mass-produce cheap uniform yellowback or paperback editions of existing works, and distribute and sell them across the British Isles, principally via the ubiquitous W. H. Smith & Sons newsagent found at most urban British railway stations. These paper bound volumes were offered for sale at a fraction of the historical cost of a book, and were of a smaller format, aimed at the railway traveller. The Routledge's Railway Library series of paperbacks remained in print until 1898, and offered the traveling public 1,277 unique titles.

The German-language market also supported examples of cheap paper-bound books: 
Bernhard Tauchnitz started the Collection of British and American Authors in 1841. These inexpensive, paperbound editions, a direct precursor to mass-market paperbacks, eventually ran to over 5,000 volumes. Reclam published Shakespeare in this format from October 1857 and went on to pioneer the mass-market paper-bound Universal-Bibliothek series from 10 November 1867.

20th century—The early years: 1930–1950
The German publisher Albatross Books revised the 20th-century mass-market paperback format in 1931, but the approach of World War II cut the experiment short. Albatross’s innovations included a standardized size, use of new sans-serif fonts, use of logo and type on the cover without an illustration, and color-coding the covers by genre.

In 1935, British publisher Allen Lane, investing his own capital,  initiated the paperback revolution in the English-language book market by releasing ten reprint titles to launch the Penguin Books imprint. Penguin Books adopted many of Albatross's innovations, including a conspicuous logo, using only type on the cover, and color-coded covers for different genres. 

The first book on Penguin's 1935 list was André Maurois' Ariel.

Lane intended to produce inexpensive books. He purchased paperback rights from publishers, ordered large print runs (such as 20,000 copies—large for the time) to keep unit prices low, and looked to non-traditional book-selling retail locations. Booksellers were initially reluctant to buy his books, but when Woolworths placed a large order, the books sold extremely well. After that initial success, booksellers showed more willingness to stock paperbacks, and the name "Penguin" became closely associated with the word "paperback" in Great Britain.

In the United States, Robert de Graaf created the Pocket Books label in 1939, partnering with Simon & Schuster to issue a similar line of reprints. Because at first Pocket Books was the only publisher of paperbacks, the term "pocket book" became synonymous with paperback in English-speaking North America. (In France, the term livre de poche, which translates as "pocket book", was used and is still in use today.) De Graaf, like Lane, negotiated paperback rights from other publishers, and produced many runs. His practices contrasted with those of Lane by his adoption of illustrated covers aimed at the North American market. To reach an even broader market than Lane, he used distributors of newspapers and magazines to distribute his books because they had a lengthy history of being aimed (in format and distribution) at mass audiences. Pocket Books were not available in book stores because they did not carry magazines.

Pocket Books established the format for all subsequent paperback publishers in the 1940s. The books measured 6.5" by 4.25" (16.5 cm by 10.8 cm), had full-color covers, and cost 25 cents. Eventually in the 1950s the height increased by 0.5" (1.4 cm) to 7" (18 cm). The width remained the same because wire display racks used in many locations could not hold wider books. With the larger size came a higher price, first 35 cents and then 50 cents.

Because of its number-one position in what became a very long list of pocket editions, James Hilton's Lost Horizon is often cited as the first American paperback book. However, the first mass-market, pocket-sized, paperback book printed in the U.S. was an edition of Pearl Buck's The Good Earth, produced by Pocket Books as a proof-of-concept in late 1938, and sold in New York City. 

The first ten Pocket Book titles published in May 1939 with a print run of about 10,000 copies each were 1 Lost Horizon (1933) by James Hilton, 2 Wake Up and Live (1936) by Dorothea Brande, 3 Five Great Tragedies by William Shakespeare, 4 Topper (1926) by Thorne Smith, 5 The Murder of Roger Ackroyd (1926) by Agatha Christie, 6 Enough Rope (1926) by Dorothy Parker, 7 Wuthering Heights (1847) by Emily Brontë, 8 The Way of All Flesh (1903) by Samuel Butler, 9 The Bridge of San Luis Rey (1927) by Thornton Wilder, and 10 Bambi (1928 English translation) by Felix Salten This list includes seven novels, the most recent being six years old (Lost Horizons, 1933), two classics (Shakespeare and Wuthering Heights, both out of copyright), one mystery novel, one book of poetry (Enough Rope), and one self-help book.

The success of Pocket Books led to others entering the market. In 1941, American News Company, a magazine distributor, bought a dime novel publisher partially owned by brother and sister Joseph Meyers and Edna Meyers Williams and hired them to organize a new company called "Avon Publications". Avon copied the basic format established by Pocket Books but differentiated itself by emphasizing, as a book on collecting paperbacks says, "popular appeal rather than loftier concepts of literary merit." In 1953, Time magazine summarized its books as "westerns, whodunits, and the kind of boy-meets-girl story that can be illustrated by a ripe cheesecake jacket [cover]". 

The next year Dell Publishing, which was founded in 1921 by George T. Delacorte Jr. to publish pulp magazines, joined with Western Publishing to publish Dell Books. Like Avon, Dell followed the basic format established by Pocket Books. But within that format, "Dell achieved more variety than any of its early competitors [with its] . . . instantly identifiable format of vibrant airbrushed covers for its predominantly genre fiction", specialized logos and special features like maps and lists of characters.

During World War II, the U.S. military distributed some 122 million "Armed Services Editions" paperback novels to the troops. After the war, the former servicemen's and women's familiarity with paperbacks helped popularize the format after the war.

After the war two new developments changed the nature of the mass-market paperback business. One was the decision by publishers to publish more recent best selling books than the older books originally published by Pocket Book. They sought reprint rights on new books and soon found themselves in competition for the biggest sellers, leading to bidding against each other for the rights and costing them more money.

The second development was the spinner rack, a metal pole with a four-sided wire frame designed to vertically hold rows of racks of paperback books. Retail store owners no longer had to devote feet of valuable counter space to low-profit paperbacks, up to 100 or more could be displayed vertically in five or six square feet of floor space. (Similar racks were available for magazines and comic books, too.) By the late 1940s, paperback spinner racks were ubiquitous in large and small towns across the United States, in every local grocery store, drug store, dime store, bus and train station, displaying everything from best sellers and mysteries and westerns to classics and Shakespeare. In 1955, in William Inge's Broadway play Bus Stop, it did not seem unbelievable that a long-distance bus traveller stranded by a snowstorm in an out-of-the-way cafe walks to a shelf and picks up a paperback copy of Four Tragedies of Shakespeare. "Sometimes one can find Shakespeare on these shelves among the many lurid novels of juvenile delinquents," he comments.

In 1945, Bantam Books was formed by Walter B. Pitkin Jr., Sidney B. Kramer, and husband and wife Ian and Betty Ballantine as a mass—–market paperback publisher.

The fifth major 1940s publisher of mass-market paperbacks was New American Library. Originally Penguin U. S. A., it became a separate publisher in 1948 as the New American Library of World Literature when it separated from Penguin and Victor Weybright and Kurt Enoch took over. Its original focus was classics and scholarly works as well as popular and pulp fiction. Eventually it shortened its name to New American Library and published books in the Mentor and Signet lines. 

New paperback publishers continued to enter the market - Lion Books and Pyramid Books  (both 1949),  Fawcett Gold Medal Books (1950), Ace Books and Ballantine Books (both 1952), and Berkley Books (1955).

The 1950s—The paperback original (fiction) revolution
(The term "paperback original" applies to paperback original publications of fiction. It is not usually applied to original non–fiction publications, although paperback publishers also began issuing original non–fiction titles.)

At first, paperbacks consisted entirely of reprints, but in 1950, Fawcett Publications' Gold Medal Books began publishing original fiction in mass–market paperback. It was revolutionary.

Fawcett, an independent newsstand distributor, in 1945, negotiated a contract with New American Library to distribute its Mentor and Signet titles. That contract prohibited Fawcett from becoming a competitor by publishing its own paperback reprints. Roscoe Kent Fawcett wanted to establish a line of Fawcett paperbacks, and he felt original works would not be a violation of the contract. To challenge the contract, Fawcett published two anthologies—The Best of True Magazine and What Today's Woman Should Know About Marriage and Sex—reprinting material from Fawcett magazines not previously published in books. 

After these books were successfully published, Fawcett announced in December 1949 that in February 1950 it would publish "original fiction including westerns and mysteries at 25 cents in a pocket-sized format" in a series called Gold Medal Books. Publishers Weekly reported in May 1950 that Fawcett books were "similar in appearance and cover allure to many of the paperback reprints, but the story material [was] original and not reprinted from regular editions." It also said the authors would be paid a $2,000 advance with a guaranteed first printing of 200,000 copies.

That same month Fawcett released the first four Gold Medal books, original novels by W. R. Burnett, Sax Rohmer, Richard Himmel, and John Flagg - one western and three mysteries/adventure novels.

Fawcett's action led to immediate controversy, with an executive Vice president of Pocket Books attacking the whole idea, a literary agent reporting that one hardcover publisher threatened to boycott his agency if he dealt with mass market publishers, and Doubleday's LeBaron R. Barker claiming that paperback originals could "undermine the whole structure of publishing."

Sales soared, prompting Gold Medal editorial director Ralph Daigh to comment later, "In the past six months we have produced 9,020,645 books, and people seem to like them very well." In 1950 Gold Medal published 35 titles, in 1952, 66.

Other paperback publishers saw Gold Medal's success and began to emulate it. Publishers Weekly reported in May 1952 that Avon had included three originals in its April releases and was seeking more. It added that Dell was "'thinking about' some systematic programs of original publishing," Lion Books had "a definite original publishing program in the works", and that Graphic had begun publishing originals about a year earlier. Bantam, Pocket Books, and New American Library said they were not going to publish originals.

Also in 1952, Ace began publishing Ace Double Novel Books, two books printed in one volume for 35 cents, one a reprint and one original, with two covers and two title pages.

In 1952, husband and wife publishers Ian and Betty Ballantine left Bantam Books and founded their own publishing house, Ballantine Books, to publish paperbacks simultaneously with their publication in hardcover by traditional publishers. Their first book, Cameron Hawley's Executive Suite, published January 1, 1952 at 35 cents in the 7" height simultaneously with Houghton Mifflin's $3.00 hardcover edition, was a success for both publishers. Of their next nine novels, two were published simultaneously by Houghton Mifflin and one by Farrar, Straus & Young and six were stand-alone originals.

In 1953, Dell announced its line of originals, Dell First Editions, and published its first novels by Walt Grove, Frederic Brown, and Charles Einstein.

Genre categories began to emerge, and mass-market book covers reflected those categories. Mass-market paperbacks influenced slick and pulp magazines. The market for cheap magazines diminished when buyers began to buy cheap books instead. Authors also found themselves abandoning magazines and writing for the paperback market. The leading paperback publishers often hired experienced pulp magazine cover artists, including Rudolph Belarski and Earle K. Bergey, who helped create the look and feel of paperbacks and set an appealing visual standard that continues to this day. Scores of well-known authors were published in paperback, including Arthur Miller and John Steinbeck.

World War II brought both new technology and a wide readership of men and women now in the military or employed as shift workers; paperbacks were cheap, readily available, and easily carried. Furthermore, people found that restrictions on travel gave them time to read more paperbacks. Four-color printing and lamination developed for military maps made the paperback cover eye catching and kept ink from running as people handled the book. A revolving metal rack, designed to display a wide variety of paperbacks in a small space, found its way into drugstores, dimestores, and markets. Soldiers received millions of paperback books in Armed Services Editions.

U.S. paperbacks quickly entered the Canadian market. Canadian mass-market paperback initiatives in the 1940s included White Circle Books, a subsidiary of Collins (UK.); it was fairly successful but was soon outstripped by the success of Harlequin which began in 1949 and, after a few years of publishing undistinguished novels, focused on the romance genre and became one of the world's largest publishers.

McClelland and Stewart entered the Canadian mass-market book trade in the early 1960s, with its "Canadian best seller library" series, at a time when Canadian literary culture was beginning to be popularized, and a call for a Canadian author identity was discussed by the Canadian people.

Types

Mass-market 

The mass-market paperback is a small, usually non-illustrated, inexpensive bookbinding format. Mass-market paperbacks usually are printed on relatively low-quality paper, often acidic. They are commonly released after the hardback edition and often sold not only at bookstores, but also where books are not the main business, such as at airports, drugstores, and supermarkets.

In 1982, romance novels accounted for at least 25% of all paperback sales. In 2013, 51% of paperback sales were romance. Many titles, especially in genre fiction, have their first editions in paperback and are never published in hardcover; this is particularly true of first novels by new authors.

The mass-market paperbacks sold in airport newsstands have given rise to the vaguely defined literary genre of the "airport novel", bought by travelers to read while they sit and wait. Mass-market paperbacks also have offered collections of comic strips and magazine cartoon series, such as Ernie Bushmiller's Nancy and Chon Day's Brother Sebastian.

B-format
This size has been used to distinguish literary novels from genre fiction. In the U.S., books of this size are thought of as smaller trade paperbacks (see below).

Trade paperback

A trade paperback (also called trade paper edition and trade) is a higher-quality paperback book. If it is a softcover edition of a previous hardcover edition and is published by the same house as the hardcover, the text pages are normally identical with those of the hardcover edition, and the book is almost the same size as the hardcover edition. The pagination is the same, so that references to the text will be unchanged: this is particularly important for reviewers and scholars. The only difference is the soft binding; the paper is usually of higher quality than that of a mass-market paperback, often being acid-free paper. In the United States, the term trade paperback also encompasses the medium-sized paperbacks described as B-format, above.

Trade paperbacks did not enter the American market until around 1960. Unlike mass-market paperbacks they are distributed by their original hard-cover publishers directly to book stores, not through magazine distributors to other retailers.

Trade comics

Trade paperbacks are often used to reprint several issues of a comic series in one volume, usually an important storyline or the entire series, and the name trade paperback has become synonymous with a collection of reprinted material. Graphic novels may also be printed in trade paperback form. Publishers sometimes release popular collections first in a hardback form, followed by a trade paperback months later. Examples include Marvel Comics' Secret War and DC Comics' Watchmen.

Japanese manga, when they are collected into volumes, are published in the tankōbon format, approximately the size of a trade-sized book. The most common  sizes are Japanese B6 (128 × 182 mm) and ISO A5 (148 × 210 mm).

Major publishers

See also
 Book size
 Bunkobon
 George Kelley Paperback and Pulp Fiction Collection
 Hardcover

References

Further reading 
 Canja, Jeff (2002). Collectible Paperback Books, Second Edition, East Lansing, MI: Glenmoor Publishing. .
 Davis, Kenneth C. Two-Bit Culture: The Paperbacking of America (Macmillan, 1984).
 Hancer, Kevin (1990). Hancer's Price Guide to Paperback Books, Third Edition, Radnor, Pennsylvania: Wallace-Homestead Book Company. .

External links

 How to make a paperback book by hand
 Glue Bound Book tutorial
 "Literary Novels Going Straight to Paperback", New York Times article about paperback originals

Book formats
Book publishing
Book terminology